The United Leasing & Finance Championship was a golf tournament on the Web.com Tour. It was organized and run by the Evansville Sports Corporation and played at the Victoria National Golf Club in Newburgh, Indiana. It was first held in 2012 from June 28 to July 1. The 2015 purse was US$600,000, with $108,000 going to the winner.

In the first five years of the event, the United Leasing & Finance Championship donated more than $870,000 to over 100 Tri-State charities and continues to be broadcast around the world on the Golf Channel network.

Winners

Bolded golfers graduated to the PGA Tour via the Web.com Tour regular-season money list.

References

External links
Coverage on the Web.com Tour's official site

Former Korn Ferry Tour events
Golf in Indiana
2012 establishments in Indiana
2018 disestablishments in Indiana